Olsztyn was a Hansa A Type cargo ship which was built as Imkenturm in 1944 by Werf de Noord, Alblasserdam, Netherlands for DDG Hansa, Bremen, Germany. She was seized as a prize of war in 1945, passing to the Ministry of War Transport and renamed Empire Gantry. She was allocated to the Soviet Union in 1946 and was renamed Feodosia. Sold to Poland in 1947, she was renamed Olsztyn. She served until 1972, when she was scrapped.

Description

The engine was built by Rheinmetall-Börsig AG, Tegel, Germany.

The ship had a complement of 25, plus 8-10 gunners during wartime. She was equipped with 1×30-tonne, 1×10-tonne and 10×5-tonne cranes.

History
Imkenturm was a Hansa A Type cargo ship built in 1944 as yard number 604 by Werf de Noord, Alblasserdam, Netherlands for Deutsche Dampfschifffarts-Gesellschaft Hansa, Bremen, Germany. Her keel was laid on 29 March 1943. She was launched on 2 March 1944 and completed by Flensburger Schiffbau-Gesellschaft, Flensburg, Germany on 27 February 1945. Her port of registry was Bremen, and the Code Letters DOIJ were allocated. She participated in the Evacuation of East Prussia and was damaged in an Allied air raid on Flensburg on 1 May 1945.

On 8 May 1945, Imkenturm was seized as a prize of war at Flensburg. Her UK official number was 180638 and her call sign was GJLQ. She was registered in London and Moss Hutchinson Line Ltd managed her.

In 1946 Empire Gantry was allocated to the Soviet Union and renamed Feodosia.

In 1947, Feodosia was sold to Gdynia America Lines, Poland and was renamed Olsztyn. The Code Letters SPAH were allocated. In 1951, she was sold to Polska Żegluga Morska, Szczecin. With their introduction in the 1960s, Olsztyn was allocated the IMO Number 5662782. She served until 1972, arriving at Bruges, Belgium on 31 January for scrapping by Gebroeders Van Heygen.

References

External links
Colour photograph of Olsztyn.

1944 ships
Ships built in the Netherlands
World War II merchant ships of Germany
Steamships of Germany
Empire ships
Ministry of War Transport ships
Merchant ships of the United Kingdom
Steamships of the United Kingdom
Merchant ships of the Soviet Union
Steamships of the Soviet Union
Merchant ships of Poland
Steamships of Poland